The Gothenburg Mixed Doubles Cup is an annual mixed doubles curling tournament on the ISS Mixed Doubles World Curling Tour. It is held annually at the end of the calendar year at the Gothenburg Curling Hall in Gothenburg, Sweden.

The purse for the event is SEK75,000 with the winning team receiving SEK 30,000 and its event categorization is 500 (highest calibre is 1000).

The event has been held since 2018. It became a World Curling Tour event in 2019.

The 2021 event featured many of the teams that had qualified for the 2022 Winter Olympics.

Past champions

References

External links
Official website

World Curling Tour events
Curling competitions in Sweden
Sports competitions in Gothenburg
Mixed doubles curling